House of Love is a studio album by American country music artist Dottie West. It was released in May 1974 on RCA Victor Records and was produced by Billy Davis. It was West's 22nd studio recording in her music career and contained ten tracks. Among its singles was the song "Last Time I Saw", which became a top ten hit in 1974.

Background and content
House of Love was recorded at the RCA Studio in January 1974. The sessions were produced by Billy Davis. Over the past several years, West had written music with Davis. Their songs were used as commercial jingles for the Coca-Cola company. However, after the success of their commercial (which was turned into a hit single) called "Country Sunshine", Davis started producing West. The album consisted of ten tracks. Among its compositions was a song co-written by Davis, West and Byron Metcalf (her second husband). It also included a cover version of Diana Ross's pop hit from 1974, "Last Time I Saw Him". In addition, the project included a composition by Kris Kristofferson and a composition by Willie Nelson.

Release and reception
House of Love was released in May 1974 via RCA Victor Records and became West's 22nd studio album. It was issued as a vinyl LP, containing five songs on each side of the record. Unlike her previous studio release, House of Love did not reach the Billboard music charts, most notably the Top Country Albums chart. Billboard later reviewed House of Love and gave it a positive response. They praised the quality of the album's songs and its songwriting. "Utilizing some of the best songwriters around, Dottie has gathered some really great material for this album. Mostly soft ballads that she does with so much feeling, some up-tempo and some good country blues," writers commented.

The album included three singles that were released in 1974. "Last Time I Saw Him" was the first single released, which occurred in February 1974. After 14 weeks on the Billboard Hot Country Singles chart, the single became a major hit, climbing to #8 by May. The title track was released as the album's second single in June 1974. Spending 13 weeks chart, it eventually reached #21 on the country songs chart by September. "Lay Back Lover" was the final single released from the album (November 1974). By early 1975, the song had reached #35 on the country songs list.

Track listing

Personnel
All credits are adapted from the liner notes of House of Love.

Musical personnel

 Joe Allen — bass
 Brenton Banks — violin
 Bucky Barrett — electric guitar
 George Binkley — violin
 Marvin Chantry — viola
 Johnny Gimble — fiddle
 Martin Katahn — violin
 Sheldon Kurland — violin
 Byron Metcalf — Drums
 Martha McCrory — cello
 Weldon Myrick — steel guitar
 The Nashville Edition — background vocals
 Kenny O'Dell — acoustic guitar
 Ron Oates — piano, organ, vibes

 Dale Sellers — electric guitar
 Bobbe Seymour — steel guitar
 Steve Smith — violin
 Buddy Spicher — fiddle
 Henry Strzelecki — bass
 Chris Teal — violin
 Bobby Thompson — acoustic guitar, banjo
 David Vanderkooi — cello
 Gary Vanosdale — viola
 Bergen White — String arrangements
 Stephanie Woolf — violin
 Chip Young — acoustic guitar

Technical personnel
 Billy Davis — producer
 Al Pachucki — engineering
 Bill Vandevort — engineering

Release history

References

1974 albums
Dottie West albums
RCA Records albums